Leonard Anthony Tomkins (born 16 January 1949) is an English former footballer who played as a left winger.

Career
In 1967, Tomkins graduated from Crystal Palace's academy to the first team. During three years at the club, Tomkins made 20 Football League appearances, scoring twice. In 1971, Tomkins signed for Toronto Metros, making nine appearances, scoring three times, during the 1971 North American Soccer League season. Upon his return to England, Tomkins signed for Leyton Orient. After failing to make a league appearance for the club, Tomkins played for Chelmsford City, Gravesend & Northfleet, Aveley, Hornchurch and Bishop's Stortford.

References

1949 births
Living people
Association football midfielders
Footballers from Isleworth
English footballers
Crystal Palace F.C. players
Toronto Blizzard (1971–1984) players
Leyton Orient F.C. players
Chelmsford City F.C. players
Ebbsfleet United F.C. players
Aveley F.C. players
Hornchurch F.C. players
Bishop's Stortford F.C. players
England youth international footballers
English expatriate footballers
English expatriate sportspeople in Canada
Expatriate soccer players in Canada
English Football League players
North American Soccer League (1968–1984) players